The 1922–23 Prima Divisione season was won by Genoa.

Teams admitted
Due to the high numbers of participants, under the agreement with the Northern League, the FIGC had to organize a qualification tournament in July, in order to reduce them to three rounds of 12 sides each.

Northern League
From 1921-22 C.C.I. championship
Alessandria - Alessandria
Andrea Doria - Genoa
Bologna - Bologna
Casale - Casale Monferrato
Genoa - Genoa
Hellas Verona - Verona
Juventus - Turin
Legnano - Legnano
Mantova - Mantua
Milan - Milan
Modena - Modena
Novara - Novara
Padova - Padua
Pisa - Pisa
Pro Vercelli - Vercelli
Savona - Savona
Torino - Turin
U.S. Milanese - Milan

From 1921-22 F.I.G.C. championship
Cremonese - Cremona
Esperia Como - Como
Lucca - Lucca
Novese - Novi Ligure
Petrarca Padova - Padua
Sampierdarenese - Genoa
Spal - Ferrara
Speranza Savona - Savona
U.S. Torinese - Turin
Udinese - Udine
Virtus Bologna - Bologna

After qualification
Brescia - Brescia (CCI)
Derthona - Tortona (CCI 2nd division)
Internazionale - Milan (CCI)
Livorno  - Livorno (CCI + *)
Pastore Torino - Turin (FIGC)
Rivarolese - Genoa (FIGC)
Spezia -  La Spezia (CCI)

(*) This side is the result of the merger of U.S. Livorno (CCI) and Pro Livorno (FIGC).

Southern League
All the teams were from 1921-22 C.C.I. championship
Alba Roma - Rome
Anconitana - Ancona
Audace Taranto - Taranto
Bagnolese - Naples
Cavese - Cava de' Tirreni
Fortitudo Roma - Rome
Internaples - Naples (*)
Juventus Audax - Rome
Lazio - Rome
Lecce - Lecce
Libertas Palermo - Palermo (*)
Liberty Bari - Bari
Messina - Messina (*)
Palermo - Palermo
Pro Italia Taranto - Taranto
Savoia - Torre Annunziata
Stabia - Castellammare di Stabia
U.S. Romana - Rome

After qualification
Roman - Rome

New club
Ideale Bari - Bari

(*) These sides were the results of various mergers:
Internaples was the result of the merger of Internazionale Napoli and Naples.
Libertas Palermo was the result of the merger of the old Libertas Palermo and Azzurra Palermo.
Messina was the result of the merger of S.C. Messina and Messinese.

Northern League

Regular season
Group winners went to the final phase. Four worst clubs of each group were relegated.

Group A

Classification

Results table

Group B

Classification

Results table

Relegation tie-breaker
Played on July 1, 1923, in Genoa.

Tie-breaker
Played on July 8, 1923, in Genoa.

Group C

Classification

Results table

Promotion tie-breaker
Played on June 3, 1923, in Milan.

Padova qualified for the Final Round.

Final round

Classification

Results table

Southern League

The Southern League was a separate amatorial league, still divided in five regions. The winner were Lazio Rome.

National Finals

References and sources
Almanacco Illustrato del Calcio - La Storia 1898-2004, Panini Edizioni, Modena, September 2005

Footnotes

1923